is a Japanese manga series written and illustrated by  manga author Mera Hakamada, who has also written The Last Uniform. The manga was serialized in the Japanese seinen manga magazine Comic High! between August 22, 2006, and April 22, 2008, and is published by Futabasha. The manga has been licensed by Los Angeles-based company Seven Seas Entertainment for distribution in the English language, but the company no longer has the license. The first bound volume was released in Japanese on April 12, 2007, and the third and last bound volume was released in Japanese on May 12, 2008.

References

External links

2006 manga
Romance anime and manga
Seinen manga
Seven Seas Entertainment titles
Yuri (genre) anime and manga
Futabasha manga